Micheál Carrigy is an Irish Fine Gael politician who has served as a Senator for the Industrial and Commercial Panel since April 2020.

Early life and education
Carrigy attended St. Mel's College, Longford. He worked as a postmaster.

Political career
Carrigy was elected to Longford County Council for the first time at the 2009 local elections. He was elected Cathaoirleach of Longford County Council in June 2019.

Carrigy stood unsuccessfully in Longford–Westmeath at the 2020 general election; he won 11.2% of first preference votes and finished sixth.

Carrigy was elected to Seanad Éireann in 2020 as a Senator for the Industrial and Commercial Panel. Colin Dalton was co-opted to Carrigy's seat on Longford County Council following his election to the Seanad.

Personal life
Carrigy lives in Ballinalee, County Longford, with his wife Una and their three children.

References

External links
Micheál Carrigy's page on the Fine Gael website

Year of birth missing (living people)
Place of birth missing (living people)
Living people
Fine Gael senators
Local councillors in County Longford
Politicians from County Longford
Members of the 26th Seanad
People educated at St Mel's College